Soplaviento is a town and municipality located in the Bolívar Department, northern Colombia. The town is located on the south bank of the Dique Canal across from the town of San Estanislao.

Municipalities of Bolívar Department